The 1859 New South Wales colonial election was for 80 members representing 67 electoral districts. The election was conducted on the basis of a simple majority or first-past-the-post voting system. In this election there were 9 multi-member districts returning 22 members and 58 single member districts. In the multi-member districts each elector could vote for as many candidates as there were vacancies. 15 districts were uncontested.

The electoral districts and boundaries were established under the Electoral Act 1858 (NSW), The changes included an increase in the number of members from 54 to 80 and an increase in the number of districts from 54 to 67, with 62 new districts and only five of the former districts remained. The 62 new districts were based on the established Police districts.
The new districts included three districts for people with a mining or business licence in the goldfields, Goldfields North, Goldfields South and Goldfields West, which did not have a residential or property qualification. The average number of enrolled voters per seat in the other districts was 1,394 ranging from The Paterson (536) to The Lachlan (3,592).

Queensland separated from NSW in December 1859 and the 10 members elected for the 9 Queensland seats ceased to sit.

Election results

Argyle

Balranald

Bathurst

The Bogan

Braidwood

Brisbane

The Burnett

Camden

Canterbury

Carcoar

The Clarence

Central Cumberland

Darling Downs

East Macquarie

East Maitland

East Moreton

East Sydney

Eden

Daniel Egan was defeated as the sitting member for [[Results of the 1859 New South Wales colonial election#Monara|Monara]].

The Glebe

Goldfields North

Goldfields South

Goldfields West

Goulburn

The Gwydir

Hartley

The Hastings

The Hawkesbury

The Hume

The Hunter

Illawarra

John Hargrave was a member for East Camden.

Ipswich

Kiama

The Lachlan

Leichhardt

Liverpool Plains

The Lower Hunter

Monara

Daniel Egan was elected for [[Results of the 1859 New South Wales colonial election#Eden|Eden]].

Morpeth

Mudgee

The Murray

The Murrumbidgee

Narellan

The Nepean

New England

Four people were charged with impersonating electors and a petition was lodged against the election. The Elections and Qualifications Committee conducted a re-count.

Newcastle

Newtown

Northumberland

Orange

Paddington

Parramatta

The Paterson

Patrick's Plains

Queanbeyan

Shoalhaven

St Leonards

Tenterfield

The Tumut

The Upper Hunter

Wellington

West Macquarie

West Maitland

West Moreton

West Sydney

The Williams

Samuel Gordon was the member for the abolished district of Durham.

Windsor

Wollombi

Yass Plains

See also 

 Candidates of the 1859 New South Wales colonial election
 Members of the New South Wales Legislative Assembly, 1859–1860

Notes

References 

1859